El Dorado, founded by Matthew Rainey, is a city in, and the county seat of, Union County, on the southern border of Arkansas, United States. According to the 2010 census, the population of the city is 18,884.

El Dorado is headquarters of the Arkansas Oil and Gas Commission as well as Murphy USA, Deltic Timber Corporation and a DelekUS oil refinery. The city has a downtown arts district, the Murphy Arts District (MAD); a community college, South Arkansas Community College (SouthArk); and a multi-cultural arts center, South Arkansas Arts Center (SAAC). El Dorado is the population, cultural and business center of south central Arkansas.

The city was the heart of the 1920s oil boom in the area. During World War II, it became a center of the chemical industry, which still plays a part in the economy, as do oil and timber.

History

Timeline
 1829, the territorial legislature took sections of Hempstead and Clark counties to establish Union County.
 1843, Matthew Rainey founded and named El Dorado. El Dorado became the Union County seat that same year and the first Presbyterian church was organized.
 1845, First Baptist Church was organized.
 1870, El Dorado Baptist Church was founded and El Dorado was incorporated.
 1883, Albert Williams was lynched in El Dorado
 1891, the first passenger train arrives in El Dorado from Camden.
 1902, the Tucker-Parnell Feud erupts between Guy Tucker (city marshal), and a local businessman (Tom Parnell).
 1908, Washington High School opens.
 1919, Frank Livingston, a black World War I veteran accused of murder with scant evidence, was burned alive by a mob near El Dorado.
 1921, the Busey No. 1 well was completed. The start of the oil boom.  El Dorado is sometimes referred to as "Arkansas' Original Boomtown."
 1922, El Dorado Oil Refinery was commissioned and the B'nai B'rith lodge was founded.
 1927, the Lion Oil-Exchange Building was completed.

Geography

Topography
El Dorado is located in the West Gulf Coastal Plain: In Arkansas, the West Gulf Coastal Plain covers the southeastern and south central portions of the state along the border of Louisiana. This Lowland area of Arkansas is characterized by pine forests and farmlands. Natural resources include natural gas, petroleum deposits and beds of bromine flats. The lowest point in the state is found on the Ouachita River in the West Gulf Coastal Plain of Arkansas.

Climate
El Dorado is located in the humid subtropical zone (Köppen climate classification: Cfa).

Demographics

2020 census

As of the 2020 United States census, there were 17,756 people, 7,164 households, and 4,466 families residing in the city.

2010 census
As of the census of 2010, there were 18,884 people, 8,969 households, and 5,732 families residing in the city. The racial makeup of the city was 49.9% Black or African American, 45.1% White,  0.30% Native American, 0.71% Asian, 0.8% Pacific Islander, 0.39% from other races, and 0.86% from two or more races. 1.04% of the population were Hispanic or Latino of any race.

There were 8,686 households, out of which 30.7% had children under the age of 18 living with them, 42.9% were married couples living together, 19.1% had a female householder with no husband present, and 34.0% were non-families. Of 8,686 households, 304 are unmarried partner households: 243 heterosexual, 19 same-sex male, and 42 same-sex female. 30.7% of all households were made up of individuals, and 13.6% had someone living alone who was 65 years of age or older. The average household size was 2.40 and the average family size was 2.99.

In the city, the population was spread out, with 26.3% under the age of 18, 8.4% from 18 to 24, 25.9% from 25 to 44, 21.1% from 45 to 64, and 18.3% who were 65 years of age or older. The median age was 38 years. For every 100 females, there were 85.7 males. For every 100 females age 18 and over, there were 78.8 males.

The median income for a household in the city was $27,045, and the median income for a family was $34,753. Males had a median income of $30,876 versus $19,211 for females. The per capita income for the city was $16,332. About 20.0% of families and 24.6% of the population were below the poverty line, including 36.3% of those under age 18 and 13.8% of those age 65 or over.

Arts and culture

Venues

The Murphy Arts District (MAD) opened in 2017 in downtown El Dorado. The district includes a music hall, outdoor amphitheater, farmer's market, musical performers, restaurant with performance stage, the largest playscape in the state, and a water park.

The South Arkansas Arts Center (SAAC) is a  facility with three visual art galleries, a ballet studio, a theatre, educational classroom space, and an open art studio.  SAAC hosts stage events and art exhibitions.

The El Dorado Municipal Auditorium is a multi-purpose auditorium with a large lobby, grand hall seating, and multi-tiered sloping balcony. It has featured musical acts, entertainment shows, school productions, dance recitals and was formerly the location of the South Arkansas Symphony Orchestra, which was founded in 1956.

The El Dorado Conference Center is a  multi-purpose facility opened in 2011, which features an assembly hall
main hall, small meeting rooms, the student services for South Arkansas Community College, and bookstore, and café.

Annual events
The Mayhaw Festival occurs in May. The official event name is "Bugs Bands and Bikes". It coincides with a crawfish boil, a "Battle of the Bands", a bike show/one day motorcycle rally, a motorcycle parade, and pool tournament.
  
The "SouthArk Outdoor Expo occurs in September with activities for anglers, hunters, children, and families.

MusicFest occurs in October in an eight-block area, featuring over 30 acts on five stages.

Winter events include the "Festival of Lights" and the "largest Christmas parade in Arkansas".

Attractions

The Union County Courthouse, opened in 1928.
The South Arkansas Arboretum, opened in 1965, is Arkansas's only state park located within a city.
The Rialto Theater, listed on the National Register of Historic Places, opened in 1929 with seating for 1,400, and presented live stage shows and films.

Parks and recreation

City parks include: Lions Club Park and Golf Course, Mattocks Park, Mosby Park, Neel Park, Old City Park, and South Side Park.

The El Dorado Recreation Complex and Pavilion has a playground, baseball and softball facility and two pavilions. It is the location of the El Dorado High School Wildcat Baseball Field and Ladycat Softball Field.

Memorial Stadium is a 6,000-seat football stadium and track which hosts sports event, school teams, the Boomtown Classic, an annual college football match between in-state college football rivals.

Education

According to the 2000 Census, 22.5% of the population age 25+ had an associate degree or higher. More than 400 teachers and administrators work to meet the needs of all students regardless of age, ability, or background. Approximately 50 percent of these teachers and administrators hold advanced degrees. More than 4,600 students attend the nine El Dorado public schools in the El Dorado School District #15. A new high school with a 1500-student capacity was completed in June 2011.

Public

Elementary
There are five elementary schools in the district, divided into academies (K-4) and 1 (K-6):
Hugh Goodwin Elementary School of the Arts
Murmil Heights learning center
Northwest Elementary School of Environment
Retta Brown Elementary School of Communication and Technologies
Yocum Elementary School of Math and Science

Secondary
Washington Middle School (5-6)
Barton Junior High School (7-8)
El Dorado High School (9-12)

Collegiate
South Arkansas Community College (SouthArk), is a public two-year institution providing educational programs, services, and resources for students. SouthArk offers degrees and certificates in health sciences, industrial technologies, liberal arts, and business.

Private
Maranatha Baptist Christian School (PK-12)
West Side Christians School (PK-12) 

Light Brigade Christian Academy (PK-12)
Holy Redeemer School (1925–2005)

Media

Radio
Radio stations include: KMLK (urban adult contemporary), KDMS (southern gospel), KIXB (country), KMRX (contemporary hits), KAGL (classic rock), KELD (sports Talk), KELD-FM (news talk), KLBQ (classic country), KBSA (NPR), and KAKV.

Television
Television stations serving El Dorado include: KTVE (NBC), KETZ  (PBS), K20OC (CBS-HD), KTVE-HD (NBC-HD), K20OC (CBS), KETZ-DT (AETN/PBS), KTBS (ABC), KNOE (CBS), KARD (FOX), and KMLU (MeTV).

Print
The El Dorado News-Times is one of the oldest newspapers in South Arkansas.

Infrastructure

Major highways
 Future Interstate 69
 U.S. Highway 63
 U.S. Highway 82
 U.S. Highway 167
 Highway 7
 Highway 15

Airports
El Dorado has two airports, both owned by the city. South Arkansas Regional Airport at Goodwin Field services private aircraft and one commercial carrier, and El Dorado Downtown Airport services local industries, and offers hangar space to small private planes.

Utilities
El Dorado water is served locally by El Dorado Water Utilities, a private company. Electricity is supplied by Entergy of Arkansas. Other utility companies serving El Dorado include Summit Utilities (natural gas), Southern Lp-Gas (liquid gas), Bcs (bottled and metered gas), Suddenlink (cable TV, internet and phone), Verizon Wireless and AT&T (residential and wireless phone service).

Health systems
The city and surrounding area is served by the Medical Center of South Arkansas, MCSA, accredited by the Joint Commission on the Accreditation of Healthcare Organizations, is a general acute-care hospital licensed by the Arkansas Department of Health.

Notable people

Beryl Anthony Jr., member of the United States House of Representatives
Michael Aiken, Chancellor of the University of Illinois at Champaign-Urbana
Donna Axum, 1964 Miss America
Lou Brock, member of Baseball Hall of Fame
Albert H. Crews, astronaut and United States Air Force officer
Charlie Daniels, politician
Glenn D. Daniels, 1936-1992, founder of Country Music Television
Candice Earley, actress
Michael G. Fitzgerald, film historian and author
David Frizzell, country music singer
Lefty Frizzell, country music singer, born in Corsicana, Texas, reared in El Dorado
Daniel Gafford, NBA power forward for the Washington Wizards 
Hogan Gidley, White House Deputy Press Secretary from 2019–2020
Glen Ray Hines, professional football player
Lamar Hunt, businessman, owner of Kansas City Chiefs, member of Pro Football Hall of Fame
E. Fay Jones, architect and student of Frank Lloyd Wright
Shara Nova, lead singer of My Brightest Diamond
Qui Nguyen, playwright and founder of New York-based Vampire Cowboys Theatre Company, screenwriter of Disney's Raya and the Last Dragon 
Kevin Payne, NFL strong safety for the Carolina Panthers
Charles Portis, author of True Grit
William Ragsdale, actor
Albert Rust, U.S. Representative
Adam Setliff, two-time Olympic discus thrower
Dorothy Geneva Styles, composer, mathematician, and poet
Reece Tatum,  basketball player for Harlem Globetrotters
Dave Whitlock, light heavyweight professional prizefighter who fought Floyd Patterson in September 1955
Travis Williams, NFL running back
Josh Wilson, contemporary Christian musician
Viper, rapper and record producer

See also

 List of cities and towns in Arkansas
 National Register of Historic Places listings in Union County, Arkansas

References

Further reading
Jay Herrod, "Story of Arkansas's Oil Boom Unfolds at Smackover Museum." Arkansas Department of Parks and Tourism: November 26, 2002.

External links

History of El Dorado's Jewish community (from the Institute of Southern Jewish Life)
Encyclopedia of Arkansas History & Culture entry: El Dorado (Union County)

 
1843 establishments in Arkansas
Cities in Arkansas
Cities in Union County, Arkansas
County seats in Arkansas
Micropolitan areas of Arkansas
Planned cities in the United States
Populated places established in 1843